Burgau (Schwab) station, is a railway station in the town of Burgau, in Bavaria, Germany. It is located on the standard gauge Ulm–Augsburg line of Deutsche Bahn.

Services
 the following services stop at Burgau (Schwab):

 RE: hourly service between Ulm Hauptbahnhof and München Hauptbahnhof.

References

External links
 
 

Railway stations in Bavaria
Buildings and structures in Günzburg (district)